Sarah Sze (born 1969) is an American artist widely recognized for challenging the boundaries of painting, installation, and architecture. Sze's sculptural practice ranges from slight gestures discovered in hidden spaces to expansive installations that scale walls and colonize architectures.  Sze's work explores the role of technology and information in contemporary life utilizing everyday materials. Drawing from Modernist traditions, Sze's work often represents objects caught in suspension. Sze lives and works in New York City and is a professor of visual arts at Columbia University.

Early life and education 
Sze was born in Boston in 1969. Sze attributes her approach to seeing the world to growing up around models and plans and to regular discussions of buildings and cities. She received a BA in Architecture and Painting from Yale University in 1991 and an MFA from New York's School of Visual Arts in 1997.

Career
Sze draws from Modernist traditions of the found object, to build large scale installations. She uses everyday items like string, Q-tips, photographs, and wire to create complex constellations whose forms change with the viewer's interaction. The effect of this is to "challenge the very material of sculpture, the very constitution of sculpture, as a solid form that has to do with finite geometric constitutions, shapes, and content." When selecting materials, Sze focuses on the exploration of value acquisition–what value the object holds and how it is acquired. In an interview with curator Okwui Enwezor, Sze explained that during her conceptualization process, she will "choreograph the experience to create an ebb and flow of information [...] thinking about how people approach, slow down, stop, perceive [her art]."

Sze represented the United States at the Venice Biennale in 2013, and was awarded a MacArthur Fellowship in 2003. Her work has been featured in The Whitney Biennial (2000), the Carnegie International (1999) and several international biennials, including Berlin (1998), Guangzhou (2015), Liverpool (2008), Lyon (2009), São Paulo (2002), and Venice (1999, 2013, and 2015).

Sze has also created public artworks for the Massachusetts Institute of Technology, the Walker Art Center, and the High Line in New York.

On January 1, 2017, a permanent installation commissioned by MTA Arts & Design of drawings by Sze on ceramic tiles opened in the 96th Street subway station on the new Second Avenue Subway line in New York City. Sze unveiled Shorter than the Day,  a permanent installation, in LaGuardia Airport in 2020 and in 2021 Sze unveiled her most recent permanent installation, Fallen Sky, at Storm King Art Center, Cornwall, NY.

Influences 
Sze's work is influenced, in part, by her admiration for Cubists, Russian Constructivists, and Futurists. Particularly, their attempt to "depict the speed and intensity of the moment and the impossibility of its stillness."

Personal life 
Sze lives in New York City with her husband Siddhartha Mukherjee and their two daughters.

Sarah’s great-grandfather, who had a waist-length queue, was the first Chinese student (Alfred Sao-ke Sze) to go to Cornell University. He became China’s minister to Britain and then ambassador to the United States. Her father, Chia-Ming Sze, was born in Shanghai; his family fled China when he was four, and resettled in the United States. He became an architect and married Judy Mossman, an Anglo-Scottish-Irish schoolteacher. Sarah and David, her older brother, grew up in Boston. (David, one of the first investors in Facebook, is a venture capitalist at Greylock Partners.) Sarah went to Milton Academy as a day student and graduated summa cum laude from Yale in 1991. Throughout her childhood, she was constantly drawing—at the dinner table, on the train, wherever she was.

Her grandfather is Szeming Sze who was the initiator of World Health Organization.

Exhibitions

Sze has staged a large number of solo exhibitions and shows across the United States and internationally. Her notable solo exhibitions include White Room (1997), White Columns, New York; Sarah Sze (1999), Museum of Contemporary Art, Chicago; Sarah Sze: The Triple Point of Water (2003-2004), originating at the Whitney Museum, New York; Triple Point (2013), American pavilion, 55th Venice Biennale; and Sarah Sze: Timelapse (2023), Solomon R. Guggenheim Museum, New York.

Sze has also participated in a wide array of group exhibitions, including the Berlin Biennale (1998); 48th and 56th Venice Biennale (1999, 2015); Whitney Biennial (2000); and Liverpool Biennial (2008).

Notable works in public collections

Seamless (1999), Tate, London
Many a Slip (1999), Museum of Contemporary Art, Los Angeles
Strange Attractor (2000), Whitney Museum, New York
Things Fall Apart (2001), San Francisco Museum of Modern Art
Untitled (Table Top) (2001), Harvard Art Museums, Cambridge, Massachusetts
Grow or Die (2002), Walker Art Center, Minneapolis
The Letting Go (2002), Museum of Fine Arts, Boston
Everything in its right place (2002-2003), National Gallery of Victoria, Melbourne, Australia
The Art of Losing (2004), 21st Century Museum of Contemporary Art, Kanazawa, Japan
Blue Poles (2004), List Visual Arts Center, Cambridge, Massachusetts
Second Means of Egress (Orange) (2004), Buffalo AKG Art Museum, Buffalo, New York
Sexton (from Triple Point of Water) (2004-2005), Detroit Institute of Arts
Proportioned to the Groove (2005), Museum of Contemporary Art, Chicago
360 (Portable Planetarium) (2010), National Gallery of Canada, Ottawa
Triple Point (Pendulum) (2013), Museum of Modern Art, New York
Mirror with Landscape Leaning (Fragment Series) (2015), Yale University Art Gallery, New Haven, Connecticut
Plywood Sunset Leaning (Fragment Series) (2015), Cleveland Museum of Art
Split Stone (Northwest) (2019), Western Gallery, Western Washington University, Bellingham

Awards and grants

 
 2020 - Inductee, American Academy of Arts and Sciences
 2018 – The American Academy of Arts and Letters, New York
 2017 – Honoree, National Academy Museum and School, New York
 2016 – Louise Blouin Foundation Award
 2014 – Amherst Honorary Degree, Doctor of the Arts, Honoris Causa
 2014 – School of the Museum of Fine Arts, Boston, Medal Award
 2013 – US Representative for the Venice Biennale
 2013 – Inducted into the National Academy 
2012 – American Federation of the Arts Cultural Leadership Award	
2012 – Laurie M. Tisch Award for civic responsibility and action and significant leadership in education, arts, culture, civic affairs and/or health
2012 – AICA Award for Best Project in a Public Space, Sarah Sze, Still Life with Landscape (Model for a Habitat), The High Line, New York, NY
2005 – Radcliffe Institute Fellow
2003 – MacArthur Fellow
2003 – Lotos Club Foundation Prize in the Arts
2002 – Atelier Calder Residency, Sache`, France
1999 – Louis Comfort Tiffany Award
1997 – The Marie Walsh Sharpe Foundation Studio Residency, New York
1997 – Rema Hort Mann Foundation Award
1997 – Paula Rhodes Memorial Award
1996 – School of Visual Arts Graduate Fellowship

Teaching

 1998 – Visiting Lecturer, Yale University, Intersections of Art and Architecture
 1999–2002 – Lecturer, School of Visual Art, Master of Fine Arts Program
 2002–2004 – Lecturer, Columbia University, School of the Arts
 2005–2008 – Adjunct Professor, Columbia University, School of the Arts
 2009–Present – Professor, Columbia University, School of the Arts

References

Further reading

External links
 
 Tanya Bonakdar Gallery
 Victoria Miro Gallery
 Venice Biennale U.S Pavilion Exhibition
 Carnegie Museum of Art site on Sze
 Sarah Sze: Infinite Line site, Asia Society
 Interview for The New Yorker with Andrea Scott, 2012

1969 births
Living people
American people of Chinese descent
Artists from Boston
Columbia University faculty
Columbia University people
MacArthur Fellows
Milton Academy alumni
School of Visual Arts alumni
Yale University alumni
20th-century American women artists
Sculptors from Massachusetts
American women academics
21st-century American women
Members of the American Academy of Arts and Letters